Ulu Kalumpang Forest Reserve is a region in Sabah, Malaysia. Located on the Tawau Peninsula, it was designated as a conservation area by the Sabah Forestry Department in 1992. The forest reserve is in an area called the Tawau Highlands, which also includes Tawau Hills National Park. The forest reserve is very mountainous, especially towards the south. A statewide orang-utan census carried out by HUTAN (an NGO based in Sukau, Kinabatangan) and the Sabah Wildlife Department estimated an Orang-utan population density of 0.42 individual/km² within the forest reserve. This orang-utan population of ~ 183 individuals is totally isolated and its long-term survival is insecure.

References

Forest reserves of Sabah
Borneo montane rain forests
Borneo lowland rain forests